Mohamed Talaat (born 12 August 1988) is an Egyptian equestrian. He competed in the 2020 Summer Olympics.

Talaat was suspended in January 2022 for doping in the form of cannabis . Based on a sample taken in August 2019 at the African Games, an FEI tribunal conducted a disciplinary hearing in October 2021. In January 2022, the tribunal ordered a two-year period of ineligibility from 17 June 2021. This includes his results at the Tokyo Games, resulting in the disqualification of the Egyptian showjumping team.

References

1988 births
Living people
Equestrians at the 2020 Summer Olympics
Egyptian male equestrians
Olympic equestrians of Egypt
Show jumping riders
20th-century Egyptian people
21st-century Egyptian people
Competitors at the 2022 Mediterranean Games
Mediterranean Games silver medalists for Egypt
Mediterranean Games bronze medalists for Egypt
Mediterranean Games medalists in equestrian